Pakistani hip hop is a music genre in Pakistan influenced heavily from merging American hip hop style beats with Pakistani poetry. The genre was initially dominated in English and Punjabi, but in recent years has expanded to Urdu, Sindhi, Pashto, and Balochi.

History
The contemporary hip hop and rap movement in Pakistan grew out of the globalization of American hip hop in the early 1990s. Some Pakistani artists began experimenting with rap and hip hop as early as 1993 when Fakhar-e-Alam released his first album Rap Up, where his single Bhangra Pao is commonly acknowledged as the "first rap song in Pakistan". In particular, the rise in popularity of Eminem in the late 1990s and 50 Cent in the early 2000s influenced many of today's hip hop artists in Pakistan such as "Party Wrecker" (Mustafa Khan) of the Pashto rap group Fortitude, Qzer (Qasim Naqvi) and DirtJaw.

The first Pakistani rap song was "Bhangra Rap" (1993) by Yatagaan (Fakhar-e-Alam), which became a major headliner on Pakistani music charts. The hit 1995 song "Billo De Ghar" by Abrar-ul-Haq also featured rapping.

Hip hop and rap culture in Pakistan during the 1990s and early 2000s was mainly centered around those with a good grasp of English (a socioeconomically privileged group). Pakistani hip hop and rap artists at this time were mainly underground English acts and were dismissed by the media and mainstream as "Eminem ki aolad" (Eminem's children) and "yo-bache" (yo-kids).

Genre development
Hip hop music in Pakistan is still an emerging genre. Since the early 1990s, it has been performed taking inspiration from underground English scenes to regional Punjabi rap in the early 2000s, before branching out into various other languages.

By the late 2000s, Punjabi rap began influencing non-Punjabi speakers to experiment with hip hop in other Pakistani languages, thus leading to new Sindhi and Pashto hip hop scenes. Urdu rap artists tried initially but failed to leave a mark on hip hop. This was due to class and linguistic politics dictated in the mid-nineteenth century by the British Raj, who had replaced Persian with Urdu as the official language. Combined with Pakistan's own tendency to privilege Urdu over indigenous languages a dichotomy was created in the country whereby Urdu is associated with urbanity, power, privilege and sophistication, while other Pakistani languages such as Punjabi, Sindhi and Pashto were considered "crass vernacularism". Although the genre has grown considerably in recent years, it is still considered fringe and underground by the older generation who tend to stick to traditional Pakistani music or Pakistani pop music.

Languages

Punjabi rap
In February 2006, Universal Music produced the first commercially backed album of Pakistani American rapper, Bohemia. A Punjabi Christian, born in Karachi, schooled in Peshawar, and brought up in the working class minority communities of San Francisco, Bohemia's music emerged from personal experiences, such as seeing his best friend murdered and several others sent to jail. Pesa Nasha Pyar (Punjabi for "Money Drugs Love") was Bohemia's second album and stood out as lyrically groundbreaking. With Universal's distribution network, Bohemia found a ready market among Pakistanis, both in the diaspora and in Pakistan itself.

Urdu rap 
The Urdu rap genre is recently the fastest growing in the country. Majority of the Urdu rappers are heavily influenced by Bohemia, a famous Punjabi rapper. In 2012, Urdu rap first gained popularity after rapper Faris Shafi released one of his controversial songs "Awaam". The song targeted the system of governance and was a sleeper hit. His other renowned songs include Muskura, Jawab de, Waasta and several others.

Subsequently, the genre gained increasing popularity after a hip hop music duo Young Stunners, consisting of two independent Urdu rappers Talha Anjum and Talha Yunus, released their first song Burger-e-Karachi, a satirical take at the westernized urban elites and upper middle class people of Karachi. The song became instantly viral. Following which they threw back to back hits among which are Maila Majnu and Laam se Chaura. They lead the Malir Rap Boys and have successfully collaborated with different artists like Irfan Junejo and Asim Azhar. Currently, they are considered the pioneers of the Urdu rap. Other collaborations include Indian rapper KR$NA, for the successful song "Quarantine". The track has over 10 million views on YouTube.

Then there is the Pindi rap scene consisting of all rounder and someone whose help put hip-hop on the map in Pakistan, Osama Com Laude who is one of the most viral, veteran & mainstream hip-hop artists in all of Pakistan with over 17 million views to his name alone, multiple shows globally, collaborating with international sensations like Edward Maya, Ali Zafar, Major Lazer, Valentino Khan. Their collaborative song Pindi Aye was also a super hit.

Other notable rappers include Chinese-Pakistani entertainer Chen-K, Rap Demon, Savage, Sunny Khan Durrani, Jani, Munab A. Manay, Wustaaz, Marshall, Maarij, Kaashxn 2damn and others.

Pashto Rap
In 2011, A rap group from Peshawar, released a track named Pukhtoon Core by Fortitude, Which instantly became popular amongst Pakistanis. This was the first time anyone made a rap song in the Pashto language. Soon the band started making hits like No Borders, Lewani, Outrageous, Alongside Rap Demon and in 2019 they finally dropped Era of Pushto which was a comeback music and it made waves across TikTok, Recently Fortitude Pukhtoon Core, Released the official Anthem of Peshawar Zalmi, for HBL PSL, and it made an instant 2 Million views in a week. They are the most famous mainstream Pashto rap group from Pakistan.

Sindhi rap
The Sindhi hip hop scene draws on a history of linguistic nationalism of Sindhis. Many Sindhi rap artists are attempting to resurrect and mainstream Sindhi culture in Pakistan using hip hop. Many Sindhi rap artists are also continuing the long Sindhi tradition of Sufi poetry, by including them into rhymes. Ali Gul Pir's Waderai Ka Beta, Meer Janweri "Piyar Jo Siphai" and are recent Sindhi rap songs that have gone mainstream and shows signs of the genre expanding beyond Punjabi.

Balochi rap
Lyari Underground (L.U.G.) & breakout artists like Sami Amiri, Anas Baloch & Eva B are promoting the Lyari/Balochi culture through hip-hop.

Saraiki rap
The Saraiki hip hop scene in the country is said to be limited due to the language being a dialect of western Punjabi language and still in its nascency.

Artists

Urdu rappers

 Talha Anjum
 Talhah Yunus

Punjabi rappers
Adil Omar
Ali Gul Pir
Bohemia
Fakhar-e-Alam
Imran Khan
Young Desi
Zack Knight

Bilingual rappers
 Lazarus (English & Urdu) 
 Adil Omar (English & Urdu)

See also
 Music of Pakistan
 List of Pakistani Hip Hop Musicians

References

Hip hop
Pakistani hip hop